Frederick Grimwade may refer to:
Frederick Sheppard Grimwade (1840–1910), Australian businessman and MP
Fred Grimwade (1933–1989), Australian politician